SportsCenterU is the college version of ESPN's flagship program SportsCenter which airs exclusively on ESPNU. The college sports news and highlight show focuses on reports of the day from men's and women's intercollegiate athletics including football, basketball, softball, baseball, lacrosse, volleyball, wrestling, and hockey. Originally planned as a daily program, SportsCenterU primarily airs Thursdays-Saturdays during the college football season, and after ESPN's Saturday Primetime college basketball games; it also airs before and after major events, such as conference championship games and national championships.  Most selection specials, such as the ones for the NCAA Division 1 softball tournament, and men's lacrosse tournament, are aired under the SportsCenterU banner.

See also
SportsCenter

References

ESPNU original programming
American sports television series
U
2006 American television series debuts